Matthew A. Boehnke (born June 1968) is an American politician from Washington. Boehnke is a Republican member of the Washington State Senate.

Career 
Boehnke, a former lieutenant colonel in the United States Army, was first elected to the state legislature in 2018, running against Democratic candidate Christopher Tracy for an open seat vacated by the departure of Larry Haler. Before joining the House of Representatives, he served on the Kennewick city council, to which he was elected in 2015.

Until 2023, Boehnke represented the 8th Legislative District, which includes the city of Kennewick, as well as parts of Richland.

In 2022, Boehnke entered the race for the Washington State Senate, representing the Eighth Legislative District of Washington. Boehnke won the race and assumed office in January 2023.

Awards 
 2020 Guardians of Small Business. Presented by NFIB.
 2021 City Champion Awards. Presented by Association of Washington Cities (AWC).

References

External links 
 Matt Boehnke at ballotpedia.org

Living people
Republican Party members of the Washington House of Representatives
21st-century American politicians
1968 births